Xue Long is a Chinese icebreaking research vessel. Built in 1993 at Kherson Shipyard in Ukraine, she was converted from an Arctic cargo ship to a polar research and re-supply vessel by Hudong–Zhonghua Shipbuilding of Shanghai by the mid-1990s. The vessel was extensively upgraded in 2007 and 2013.

, Xue Long is the only Chinese icebreaking research ship in service. A second Chinese polar icebreaker named , slightly smaller but more capable than Xue Long, entered service in July 2019.

Description 

Built at the Kherson Shipyard in Ukraine, Xue Long started her life as a Project 10621 icebreaking cargo and supply ship designed for the Russian Arctic. She was purchased by the People's Republic of China when the vessel's technical readiness level was 83% and completed as a polar research and re-supply vessel in 1994. In 2007, the ship was extensively upgraded to extend her service life by another 15 years. During the mid-life refit, the ship received a new superstructure that considerably changed her external appearance. She received another technical update in 2013 which included replacing her main engine.

The ship was originally powered by a single 8-cylinder BMZ 8DKRN60/195 low-speed, two-stroke diesel engine, a licence-built version of B&W 8L60MC, producing . During the 2013 refit, the main engine was replaced with an equally powered Wärtsilä 6RT-flex60C diesel engine. The main engine is coupled to a ducted controllable-pitch propeller. Her ice class, assigned by the China Classification Society (CCS), is B1.

Xue Long has a crew of 34 and can accommodate 128 researchers or passengers. She has  of laboratory space. In addition to a Kamov Ka-32 "Xueying" (Snow Eagle) helicopter, the ship also carries an Arctic-class ARV autonomous underwater vehicle on a regular basis.

Career

Visit to Canada 

Xue Long unexpectedly arrived in 1999 at the small Canadian coastal village of Tuktoyaktuk, on the Arctic Ocean.

The inability of the Canadian authorities to track the vessel stirred enough controversy that the incident is still being cited as evidence of Canadian unpreparedness to defend its northern sovereignty.

Arctic expeditions

The ship undertook a second Arctic expedition from 15 July to 26 September 2003. More recently the ship had been used in connection with China's efforts to maintain a scientific presence in the Antarctic.

Although used primarily to support China's annual expeditions to Antarctica, Xue Long has made four voyages to the Arctic, via the Bering Strait in 1999, 2003, 2008 and summer 2010. During her 82-day voyage in July–September 2010, the ice-strengthened research ship was able to reach a new 'highest North' record (for China), reaching 88.22 degrees North latitude, at 177.20 degrees West longitude. At that point a team of scientists boarded the ship's Ka-32 helicopter and flew to the North Pole on 20 August 2010. The ship returned to Shanghai on 20 September 2010. At China's annual Polar conference held in Shanghai in September 2011, the director of the Antarctic & Arctic agency said that Xue Long would undertake her fifth voyage to the Arctic in July 2012.

Trans-Arctic voyage, 2012
In the summer of 2012 Xue Long became the first ship from the People's Republic of China to cross the Arctic Ocean to Europe amid the record ice melt. The Xue Long left port on 2 July, sailed through the Bering Strait then joined a westbound convoy on the Northern Sea Route to the Barents Sea, before arriving in Iceland in mid-August. It departed Iceland on 20 August, sailed past Svalbard—without stopping to visit China's Arctic Yellow River Station—and made a run at the North Pole, falling short. It then sailed a high-latitude line east, back to the Bering Strait, returning to her base in Shanghai on 27 September 2012, completing its fifth Arctic voyage.
"Unfortunately we didn't reach the North Pole because Xue Longs icebreaking capability isn't strong enough," said one of the ship's officers. Of note, while China did not state how close Xue Long got to the North Pole in late August 2012, China's Polar Institute did not claim a new "high north" record, suggesting the vessel did not break her record set in 2010.

Antarctic operations
Xue Long provides annual resupply for China's Antarctic Zhongshan Station at Prydz Bay.

In January 2019, Xue Long hit an iceberg during sea fog whiteout in the Amundsen Sea and sustained damage when about 250 tonnes of ice fell on the ship. CCTV had video of sailors removing large blocks of ice, and China's Ministry of Natural Resources reported damage to the foredeck and mast.

Rescue operation of Akademik Shokalskiy, 2013–2014
In December, 2013, Xue Long embarked on her first circumpolar voyage in Antarctic. It was heading eastward from Zhongshan Station when it was dispatched along with several other icebreakers by the Australian Maritime Safety Authority to free Akademik Shokalskiy which had become trapped in ice off the East Antarctic coast. By 27 December, Xue Long, closed to within 6 nautical miles of the Akademik Shokalskiy, but had stalled in its efforts to complete the rendezvous due to encountering thick ice. Xue Long withdrew to open water to rendezvous with and provide air support for Aurora Australis and L'Astrolabe.
On 30 December, after all three icebreakers had failed to penetrate the icepack, a decision was reached to use Xue Longs helicopter to evacuate the 52 passengers off Akademik Shokalskiy, but the flights were grounded due to continuing extreme weather conditions. Originally, the plan was to have the helicopter ferry the passengers to a barge with which they would sail to the Aurora Australis, but the Xue Long became stuck in sea ice itself, unable to launch the barge.

On 2 January 2014 beginning at 18:15 Australian time (07:15 GMT) the Ka-32 helicopter from the Xue Long conducted five flights airlifting groups of 12 people from the ice next to the Akademik Shokalskiy and landing them on an ice floe near the Aurora Australis. Two additional flights were made to collect their equipment and baggage. The passengers were transferred to a small boat which took them to the Australian ship Aurora Australis as the Ka-32 helicopter is too heavy for the helipad of the Australian icebreaker. The airlift was completed within four hours. By 3 January, the Xue Long remained trapped in ice itself although it was in no immediate danger and her captain declined assistance from the still-nearby Aurora Australis. On 4 January 2014, the American icebreaker Polar Star was dispatched to assist Akademik Shokalskiy and Xue Long at request of the Chinese and Australian authorities. However, on 7 January 2014, a change of wind direction which loosened the icepack around the ships enabled Xue Long and Akademik Shokalskiy to work their own way free before the American ship arrived.

Search for Malaysia Airlines Flight 370 
Following the Akademik Shokalskiy rescue operation in the Antarctic, Xue Long docked in Perth, Western Australia. On 8 March 2014, Malaysia Airlines Flight 370 from Kuala Lumpur to Beijing disappeared. Due to its proximity to this area, Xue Long was dispatched to join the multinational search operation.

See also
Arctic policy of China
Chinese Arctic and Antarctic Administration
Yellow River Station (Arctic)

References

External links

 Xue Long (from Antarctic Philately Web site)
 M/V Xuelong (brief English-language summary from the Polar Research Institute of China site)

Icebreakers of China
Arctic research
Research vessels of China
1993 ships
Vessels involved in the search for Malaysia Airlines Flight 370